Scaridium is a genus of rotifers belonging to the family Scaridiidae.

The genus has cosmopolitan distribution.

Species:
 Scaridium bostjani Daems & Dumont, 1974 
 Scaridium elegans Segers & De Meester, 1994

References

Ploima
Rotifer genera